The "Montmorency Forest" is an experimental forest located in the unorganized territory of Lac-Jacques-Cartier, in the La Côte-de-Beaupré Regional County Municipality, in the administrative region of Capitale-Nationale, in the province of Quebec, in Canada.

This protected forest is mainly served by the forested route 33 which connects by the south to route 175.

This forestry education center is managed by the Faculty of Forestry and Geomatics from Laval University. The university received this territory – starting from an area of  – from Government of Quebec in 1964 by an emphyteutic lease of 99 years. In return, it committed to developing research and teaching in various fields of the natural sciences.

The environment 
Located in the Laurentian Mountains, the Montmorency forest is drained by the Montmorency River and by one of its tributaries, the Black river. There are four lakes: Lac Piché, Bédard, Laflamme and Joncas. The predominant forest stand is the fir forest white birch.

Climate 
Annual precipitation exceeds  and, in winter, the average snowfall exceeds 6 meters. The annual average temperature is 0.5-degree Celsius and there are approximately 133 frost-free days in the year. A weather station existed at  elevation from 1965 to 2001.  A new station was established at  beginning in 2003. The weather box uses climate normals from the first station.

Activities

Teaching and research 
The Montmorency Forest is a training place for students of the 1st cycle and an open-air laboratory for students of the second and third cycle, researchers and professors from Laval University, especially those from Center d'études de la forêt. The Main Pavilion has spaces large enough to accommodate groups in training. Research is done mainly in forestry, but also in biology and game management. Over a hundred dissertations and theses dealing with one aspect or the other of the Montmorency Forest have been deposited at the Faculty of Graduate Studies of the University Laval since the creation of the experimental station.

Sustainable development 
The Montmorency Forest is exploited for its forest resources according to the principles of a versatile and sustainable management. Cuts with soil protection of limited dimensions are practiced gradually and irregularly, so that the forest presents a mosaic of stands of different ages. Special care is taken to protect regeneration during operations logging.

Outdoor activities 
In winter, cross-country skiing is practiced from the beginning of November. The thick layer of snow also makes the forest an excellent place for snowshoeing. In summer, hiking and fishing are common activities.

Notes and references

See also 
Forêt de Montmorency Site – Natural Resources Canada
Forêt Montmorency – Faculty of forestry and geomatics
Lac-Jacques-Cartier, un territoire non-organisé
Montmorency River
Noire River

Montmorency Forest
Forestry
Protected areas of Capitale-Nationale
Forests of Canada
La Côte-de-Beaupré Regional County Municipality
Laurentides Wildlife Reserve